Australian Catholic University (ACU) is a public university in Australia. It has seven Australian campuses and also maintains a campus in Rome.

History 

Australian Catholic University was opened on 1 January 1991 following the amalgamation of four Catholic tertiary institutions in eastern Australia:
 Catholic College of Education Sydney, New South Wales
 Institute of Catholic Education, Victoria
 McAuley College, Queensland
 Signadou College of Education, Australian Capital Territory

These institutions had their origins in the mid-1800s, when religious orders and institutes became involved in preparing teachers for Catholic schools and, later, nurses for Catholic hospitals. Through a series of amalgamations, relocations, transfers of responsibilities and diocesan initiatives, more than 20 historical entities have contributed to the creation of the university.

Governance 

ACU's vice-chancellor and president, Zlatko Skrbis, is responsible for representing the university both nationally and internationally and for providing strategic leadership and management.

Deputy vice-chancellors have delegated responsibility for assigned areas of policy. These areas are academic, administration and resources, and research.

Each faculty is headed by an executive dean and supported by a number of associate deans and heads of schools.

Campuses 

ACU has seven campuses across Australia: Ballarat, Brisbane, Canberra, Melbourne and Sydney (Blacktown, North Sydney, Strathfield) with a Leadership Centre in Adelaide and another in Townsville. In 2015, the university opened the Rome Centre, a collaboration with the Catholic University of America, located in Rome, Italy.

The Mount St Mary Campus in Strathfield is heritage listed.

Student life 
Each ACU campus has a student representative council and there is a national student body called the Australian Catholic University National Students' Association (ACUNSA), which advocates on behalf of students both individually and collectively.

The university hosts an annual national sporting event – the ACU Games – and students also compete in Australia's largest annual multisport event, the Australian University Games.

Notable alumni 
Ellie Cole - paralympic swimmer and wheelchair basketball player

Controversy 

In 2023, Librarians working at the university were ordered to remove rainbow flags that were displayed in the library. The university emailed starr stating that the flags were not considered appropriate and needed to be removed from the public area. The staff defended the placement of flags saying that the move to remove the flags is an affront to the common good. The University does allow the display of the Australian, indigenous, and Vatican flags on campus.

See also

 List of universities in Australia

References

External links 
 

 Strategic Alliance of Catholic Universities

 
Universities in Queensland
Universities in Brisbane
Universities in Sydney
Universities in Melbourne
Universities in the Australian Capital Territory
Catholic universities and colleges in Australia
Nursing schools in Australia
Art schools in Australia
Educational institutions established in 1991
Banyo, Queensland
Association of Catholic Colleges and Universities
1991 establishments in Australia
Municipality of Strathfield
Schools in Queensland
North Sydney, New South Wales